Gōnghuì (公会) may refer to:

 Gonghui, Hezhou, town in Babu District, Hezhou, Guangxi, China
 Gonghui, Zhangbei County, town in Hebei, China